Intoxicated by Love (romanized: Mast-e Eshgh) is an upcoming Iranian-Turkish biographical historical drama film directed and written by Hassan Fathi. It revolves around two persian poets Rumi and Shams Tabrizi, played by Parsa Pirouzfar and Shahab Hosseini.

Premise 
The series is a take on the life and career of the 13th-century Persian Sufi mystic and poet Rumi and his relationship with Shams Tabrizi.

Cast 
 Parsa Pirouzfar as Rumi
 Shahab Hosseini as Shams Tabrizi
 Burak Tozkoparan as Sultan Walad
 Boran Kuzum as Ala ad-Din Muhammad II
 Hesam Manzour as Husam al-Din Chalabi
 Hande Erçel as Kimia Khatoon
 Bensu Soral as Maryam
 Selma Ergeç as Kera Khatoon
 İbrahim Çelikkol as Eskandar

References

External links 

 
Turkish multilingual films
Iranian multilingual films
2020s Persian-language films
2020s Turkish-language films
Iranian historical drama films
Turkish historical drama films